Hiroden Streetcar Route 2, or the "Hiroshima Station - Hiroden-Miyajima-guchi Route" runs between Hiroshima Station and Hiroden-miyajima-guchi Station in the city of Hiroshima, Japan.

Overview

Lines
Hiroden Streetcar route #2 is made up of two lines which converge at Hiroden-Nishi-Hiroshima station. Most trains goes straight through from each side.
█ Hiroden Main Line
█ Hiroden Miyajima Line

Stations

References 

2